Sicilian Uprising or Sicilian Vespers (Italian: Vespro siciliano) is a 1949 Italian historical drama film directed by Giorgio Pastina and starring Marina Berti, Clara Calamai and Roldano Lupi. The film is set in 1282, showing the events leading up to the War of the Sicilian Vespers. It is based on the libretto of the Verdi opera I vespri siciliani, which was itself based on an earlier play written by Eugène Scribe and Charles Duveyrier.

Cast
 Marina Berti as Laura 
 Clara Calamai as Elena Di Caltabellotta 
 Roldano Lupi as Giovanni Da Procida
 Steve Barclay as Capitaine Drouet
 Paul Muller as Duke de Saint-Rémy, Governor of Palermo
 Ermanno Randi as Ruggero  
 Aldo Silvani as Abbot of Santo Spirito
 Carlo Tamberlani as Tommaso
 Aroldo Tieri as Folco
 Gabriele Ferzetti
 Gianni Glori
 Felice Minotti

References

Bibliography
 Gesù, Sebastiano. La Sicilia e il cinema. Giuseppe Maimone, 1993. 
 Aroldo Tieri e il Cinema. Pellegrini Editore, 2007.

External links 

1949 films
Italian historical drama films
1940s historical drama films
1940s Italian-language films
Films based on operas
Films based on works by Eugène Scribe
Films directed by Giorgio Pastina
Films set in the 13th century
Films set in Sicily
Italian black-and-white films
War of the Sicilian Vespers
Films scored by Enzo Masetti
1940s Italian films